Jason Bell is an Australian former professional rugby league footballer who played in the 1980s, 1990s and 2000s in the National Rugby League. His position of preference was at five-eighth.

Parramatta
A Parramatta junior, Bell made his first grade debut in 1989. He played 53 games for Parramatta before transferring to North Sydney at the start of the 1993 season. However he only played one first grade game for Norths during the 1993 season.

Souths
Bell rejuvenated his career by moving across the harbour to South Sydney. Here he played 58 games in three years for the club, and was regarded as a senior player by the time he was 24. He formed a solid halves combination with Craig Field.

Return to the Eels
His strong form at South Sydney gave him the opportunity to return home to Parramatta, and he went on to play another fifty three games for the club. In 1997 he won the club's Jack Boyle Tackling School Award, which is awarded to the club's best tackler each season.  In 1998, Bell played 22 games for Parramatta and was a member of the side which nearly made the grand final that year but suffered defeat to Canterbury in the preliminary final.  With less than 10 minutes to go on the clock, Parramatta were winning 18-2 but lost the game 32-20 in extra time.

By 1999 however, he was struggling to make first grade and instead captained the Eels reserve grade team to a win in the NSWRL First Division Grand Final.

Final Years
He was not re-signed by Parramatta for 2000 and instead he joined the Newtown club in the NSWRL First Division.  Newtown had a feeder relationship with the Auckland Warriors, and mid-season injuries to Stacey Jones and John Simon saw him signed by the Warriors. He played eight games to finish off the season for the Warriors.

At the end of the 2000 season the Warriors were sold and the new owners did not opt to re-sign Bell.

References

Sources
 

1971 births
Living people
Australian rugby league players
New Zealand Warriors players
Parramatta Eels players
North Sydney Bears players
Newtown Jets NSW Cup players
South Sydney Rabbitohs players
Rugby league five-eighths
Rugby league players from Sydney
South Sydney Rabbitohs captains